From Justin to Kelly is a 2003 American musical romantic comedy film written by Kim Fuller and directed by Robert Iscove. The film, starring American Idol first-season winner Kelly Clarkson and runner-up Justin Guarini, won the Golden Raspberry Award for "Worst 'Musical' of Our First 25 Years" in 2005. This film is often regarded as one of the worst movies ever made.

Plot 
In Texas, Kelly Taylor works as a waitress and singer at a bar, where many of the cowboy clientele, including Luke, flirt with her. She is invited by her college classmates Alexa and Kaya to vacation in Miami, Florida for spring break. Although she generally finds the usual spring break partying and sexual activities demeaning, she accepts the offer to escape from her miserable job. Meanwhile, Pennsylvanian college student Justin Bell is also in Miami with his friends Brandon and Eddie running the BR&J party promoter business. Brandon is just interested in one-night stands, while Eddie is a geek who is trying to meet up with his internet girlfriend Lizzie.

When Kelly, Alexa, and Kaya arrive they dance at a beach concert ("The Bounce (The Luv)"), where Kelly first encounters Justin. Kelly and her friends watch as Justin and Brandon give Eddie dating advice ("Brandon's Rap"), but leave when Brandon moons them and Brandon is given a ticket by police officer Cutler.

Later, Justin and Kelly look for each other at a party ("Forever Part of Me"). They meet in a bathroom, where Kelly draws her phone number on a napkin and tosses it to him, but it misses and it falls in a puddle. Justin asks Alexa for Kelly's number, but she gives him her own number instead and says it's Kelly's. Later that night she texts Justin, pretending to be Kelly, and says she's not interested in him. Meanwhile, Kaya starts seeing a busboy, Carlos, and they visit a Salsa club together ("It's Meant to Be").

The next day, Alexa signs Kelly up for BR&J's whipped cream bikini contest so that she can see what kind of person Justin really is. Kelly is initially angry at Justin for participating in such a degrading contest, but they run into each other at a food truck and she agrees to go on a boat ride with him. They bond on the boat ("Timeless") and agree to meet at the beach the next night. Meanwhile, Brandon gets a ticket from Cutler for hosting the contest without a permit, and Kaya complains to Carlos' boss about how he's treating him, which results in Carlos being fired.

Alexa texts Justin, pretending to be Kelly and tells him to meet at a bar instead of the beach. Alexa sings about how she is wishing for love ("Wish Upon a Star"), and when Justin shows up she tells him that Kelly has a boyfriend back home, and calls Luke and asks him to come to Florida. Eddie continues to look for his online date, but gets beat up by a jock and misses their rendezvous.

Later, Kelly is upset at Justin for not showing up at the beach ("Madness"), and Luke shows up and claims Kelly is his girlfriend. Luke and Justin start to fight but agree to settle things with a hovercraft race. Luke is injured, and Brandon gets a ticket from Cutler for gambling on the race. Justin asks Alexa for advice on how to win Kelly back, but Alexa kisses him, which Kelly sees. Carlos gets angry at Kaya for interfering with his life but later realizes that he should've stood up to his boss sooner, and apologizes to Kaya by arranging a romantic dinner for the two of them in a pool.

At a bar that night, Kelly picks up Alexa's phone and sees the messages between her and Justin, and Alexa confesses that she was jealous of all the attention Kelly gets from guys. Alexa admits to Justin that she's been trying to keep him and Kelly apart, and arranges for the two to reunite ("Anytime"). The next day Justin and Kelly, Kaya and Carlos, Brandon and Cutler, and Eddie and Lizzie dance at a pool party ("That's the Way (I Like It)").

Cast

Production 
From Justin to Kelly was made in about  months; three weeks was spent for actor readings of the script (of which revisions were still going on) and rehearsals for dances and singing before the six-week shooting schedule. American Idol competitors R. J. Helton and Christina Christian visited the set but don't appear in the film.

Release 
Some theater chains threatened not to screen the film at all when distributor 20th Century Fox announced plans to rush it to VHS and DVD a mere six weeks after its opening weekend, but Fox ultimately relented and pushed the release date back a number of months. After underperforming its first weekend, Fox reinstated the original release schedule and the film was released via home media on August 26, 2003.

Reception

Box office 
In its opening weekend, From Justin to Kelly grossed $2,715,848 in 2,001 theaters in the United States and Canada, ranking #11 at the box office. By the end of its run on July 24, 2003, the film had grossed $4,928,883 in the domestic box office. Based on a $12 million budget, the film was a box office bomb.

Critical reception 
The film has a 8% approval rating on Rotten Tomatoes based on 63 reviews; the average rating is 3.2/10. The consensus states: "A notorious stinker, From Justin to Kelly features banal songs, a witless plot, and non-existent chemistry between its American Idol-sanctioned leads." The film has a score of 14 out of 100 on Metacritic based on 16 critics, indicating "overwhelming dislike". Audiences polled by CinemaScore gave the film an average grade of "C+" on an A+ to F scale.

Entertainment Weekly film critic Owen Gleiberman wrote in his review, "How bad is From Justin to Kelly? Set in Miami during spring break, it's like Grease: The Next Generation acted out by the food-court staff at SeaWorld." Time magazine described the film as "a monstrous Idol movie musical that in the most generous light is the worst film so far this century".

Reception from Clarkson 
Clarkson has since stated that before the film went into production, she pleaded with the creator of American Idol to be relieved from the contractual obligation to star in the film and that she has always disliked From Justin to Kelly. In an interview, she admitted she joined the film only because she was contractually obligated to do so: "I knew when I read the script it was going to be real, real bad, but when I won, I signed that piece of paper, and I could not get out of it."

Accolades 
The film is listed in Golden Raspberry Award founder John Wilson's book The Official Razzie Movie Guide as one of the 100 Most Enjoyably Bad Movies Ever Made.

The choreography was considered so bad that a special Golden Raspberry "Governor's Award" was created as an excuse to present the film with a Razzie.

Total Film magazine ranked the film at number 16 in their list of "66 Worst Movies Of All Time".

Home media
The DVD release includes an extended version of 90 minutes which has two new musical numbers, "From Me to You" and "Brighter Star", additional lyrics, more sensual choreography to "Wish Upon a Star", and a scene involving a "Dare to Be Bare" contest. A Blu-ray version of the film has yet to be released.

Soundtrack 
A commercial soundtrack with studio tracks was produced but remains unreleased due to the film's negative reception and unsatisfactory box office returns. However, a version of the song "Timeless", sung by Clarkson and Guarini, and recorded prior to the film, was included on Guarini's self-titled debut album. The tracks of the unreleased studio soundtrack can be found on various Clarkson fan sites. Two songs, "From Me to You" and "Brighter Star", did not appear in the theatrical release, but were added to the extended version DVD release. Clarkson also performed "The Bounce (The Luv)", and "Timeless" during her shared (with Clay Aiken) "Independent Tour" in 2003 with her male backup singer performing the male vocals on "Timeless".

Songs used in the film and soundtrack (in order of appearance):
 "I Won't Stand in Line" (Original artist: Reba McEntire)
 "Vacation" (Original artist: The Go-Go's)
 "The Bounce (The Luv)"
 "Brandon's Rap"
 "Forever Part of Me"
 "It's Meant to Be"
 "Timeless" (Also released on Guarini's debut CD Justin Guarini)
 "Brighter Star" (Extended version)
 "Wish Upon a Star"
 "Anytime" (Alternate version on Clarkson's debut CD Thankful)
 "Madness"
 "Timeless (Reprise)"
 "From Me to You" (Extended version)
 "Anytime (Reprise)"
 "That's the Way (I Like It)" (Lyrically changed cover of a song by KC and the Sunshine Band)
 "Sugar"

See also 
 Box office bomb
 List of films considered the worst

References

External links
 
 
 
 

American Idol
2003 films
2000s musical comedy films
2003 romantic comedy films
2000s romantic musical films
20th Century Fox films
American musical comedy films
American romantic comedy films
American romantic musical films
2000s English-language films
Films about music and musicians
Films about spring break
Films set in Florida
Films shot in Florida
Films directed by Robert Iscove
Films scored by Michael Wandmacher
Beach party films
Golden Raspberry Award winning films
2000s American films